Neoepimorius is a genus of snout moths. It was described by Paul Ernest Sutton Whalley in 1964.

Species
 Neoepimorius lineola Whalley, 1964
 Neoepimorius maroni Whalley, 1964

References

Tirathabini
Pyralidae genera